St. Mary's High School, North Lakhimpur is a Catholic school affiliated to the Secondary Education Board of Assam. The school has classes from KG to X. It was established on 8 March 1966 by the Missionary Sisters of Mary Help of Christians (MSMHC). The motto of the school is to educate person with character and competence to build a civilization of love.

See also 
 List of Christian schools in India

Reference

References

High schools and secondary schools in Assam
Christian schools in Assam
Salesian secondary schools
Lakhimpur district
Educational institutions established in 1966
1966 establishments in Assam